Catherine Hayes may refer to:

Catherine Hayes (murderer) (1690-1726), English murderer
Catherine Hayes (soprano) (1818-1861), Irish opera singer
Catherine Hayes, main character of Thackeray's Catherine, based on the murderer
Kathryn Hays, actress

See also
Kathryn Hay, politician
Hayes (surname)